Kai Outa (22 September 1930 – 5 March 2002) was a Finnish weightlifter. He competed in the men's middle heavyweight event at the 1952 Summer Olympics.

References

1930 births
2002 deaths
Finnish male weightlifters
Olympic weightlifters of Finland
Weightlifters at the 1952 Summer Olympics
Sportspeople from Helsinki
20th-century Finnish people